Everton Football Club is an English professional association football club based in Liverpool that competes in the Premier League, the top tier of English football. The club was a founder member of the Football League in 1888, and has, as of May 2022, competed in the top division for a record 119 seasons, having missed only four top-flight seasons (1930–31, 1951–52, 1952–53 and 1953–54). Everton is the club with the second-longest continuous presence in English top-flight football, and ranks third in the all-time points rankings. The club has won nine league titles, five FA Cups, one European Cup Winners' Cup and nine Charity Shields.

Formed in 1878, Everton won their first League Championship during the 1890–91 season. After winning four more League championships and two FA Cups, the club experienced a post-Second World War lull until a revival in the 1960s. A period of sustained success came in the mid-1980s, when Everton won a further two League championships, one FA Cup, and the 1985 European Cup Winners' Cup. The club's most recent major trophy was the 1995 FA Cup.

The club's supporters are colloquially known as "Evertonians" or "Blues". Everton's main rivals are Liverpool, whose home stadium at Anfield is just under one mile away from Everton's home at Goodison Park; the two clubs contest the Merseyside derby. Everton have been based at Goodison Park since 1892, having moved from their original home at Anfield following a disagreement over its rent. The club's home colours are royal blue shirts with white shorts and socks.

History 

Everton was founded as St. Domingo's FC in 1878 so that members of the congregation of St Domingo Methodist New Connexion Chapel in Breckfield Road North, Everton could play sport year round – cricket was played in summer. The club's first game was a 1–0 victory over Everton Church Club. The club was renamed Everton in November 1879 after the local area, as people outside the congregation wished to participate.

The club was a founding member of the Football League in 1888–89 and won its first League Championship title in the 1890–91 season. Everton won the FA Cup for the first time in 1906 and the League Championship again in 1914–15. The outbreak of the First World War in 1914 interrupted the football programme while Everton were reigning champions, which was something that would again occur in 1939.

It was not until 1927 that Everton's first sustained period of success began. In 1925 the club signed Dixie Dean from Tranmere Rovers. In 1927–28, Dean set the record for top-flight league goals in a single season with 60 goals in 39 league games, which is a record that still stands. He helped Everton win its third League Championship that season. However, Everton was relegated to the Second Division two years later during internal turmoil at the club. The club quickly rebounded and was promoted at the first attempt, while scoring a record number of goals in the Second Division. On return to the top flight in 1931–32, Everton wasted no time in reaffirming its status and won a fourth League Championship at the first opportunity. Everton also won its second FA Cup in 1933 with a 3–0 win against Manchester City in the final. The era ended in 1938–39 with a fifth League Championship.

The outbreak of the Second World War again saw the suspension of league football, and when official competition resumed in 1946, the Everton team had been split up and paled in comparison to the pre-war team. Everton was relegated for the second time in 1950–51 and did not earn promotion until 1953–54, when it finished as the runner-up in its third season in the Second Division. The club has been a top-flight presence ever since.

Everton's second successful era started when Harry Catterick was made manager in 1961. In 1962–63, his second season in charge, Everton won the League Championship. In 1966 the club won the FA Cup with a 3–2 win over Sheffield Wednesday. Everton again reached the final in 1968, but this time was unable to overcome West Bromwich Albion at Wembley. Two seasons later in 1969–70, Everton won the League Championship, finishing nine points clear of nearest rivals Leeds United. During this period, Everton was the first English club to achieve five consecutive years in European competitions – covering the seasons from 1961–62 to 1966–67.

However, the success did not last; the team finished fourteenth, fifteenth, seventeenth and seventh in the following seasons. Harry Catterick retired, but his successors failed to win any silverware for the remainder of the 1970s despite finishing fourth in 1974–75 under manager Billy Bingham, third in 1977–78 and fourth the following season under manager Gordon Lee. Lee was sacked in 1981.

Howard Kendall took over as manager and guided Everton to its most successful era. Domestically, Everton won the FA Cup in 1984 and two League Championships in 1984–85 and 1986–87. In Europe, the club won its first, and so far only, European trophy by securing the European Cup Winners' Cup in 1985. The European success came after first beating University College Dublin, Inter Bratislava and Fortuna Sittard. Then, Everton defeated German giants Bayern Munich 3–1 in the semi-finals, despite trailing at half time (in a match voted the greatest in Goodison Park history), and recorded the same scoreline over Austrian club Rapid Vienna in the final. Having won both the League and Cup Winners' Cup in 1985, Everton came very close to winning a treble, but lost to Manchester United in the FA Cup final. The following season, 1985–86, Everton was the runner-up to Liverpool in both the League and the FA Cup, but did recapture the League Championship in 1986–87.

After the Heysel Stadium disaster and the subsequent ban of all English clubs from continental football, Everton lost the chance to compete for more European trophies. A large proportion of the title-winning side was broken up following the ban. Kendall himself moved to Athletic Bilbao after the 1987 title triumph and was succeeded by assistant Colin Harvey. Harvey took Everton to the 1989 FA Cup Final, but lost 3–2 after extra time to Liverpool.

Everton was a founding member of the Premier League in 1992, but struggled to find the right manager. Howard Kendall had returned in 1990, but could not repeat his previous success. His successor, Mike Walker, was statistically the least successful Everton manager to date. When former Everton player Joe Royle took over in 1994, the club's form started to improve; his first game in charge was a 2–0 victory over derby rivals Liverpool. Royle dragged Everton clear of relegation and led the club to the FA Cup for the fifth time in its history by defeating Manchester United 1–0 in the final. The cup triumph was also Everton's passport to the Cup Winners' Cup, its first European campaign in the post-Heysel era. Progress under Royle continued in 1995–96 as the team climbed to sixth place in the Premiership. A fifteenth-place finish the following season saw Royle resign towards the end of the campaign, and he was temporarily replaced by club captain Dave Watson.

Howard Kendall was appointed Everton manager for the third time in 1997, but the appointment proved unsuccessful as Everton finished seventeenth in the Premiership. The club only avoided relegation due to its superior goal difference over Bolton Wanderers. Former Rangers manager Walter Smith then took over from Kendall in the summer of 1998, but only managed three successive finishes in the bottom half of the table. The Everton board finally ran out of patience with Smith, and he was sacked in March 2002 after an FA Cup exit at Middlesbrough and with Everton in real danger of relegation. His replacement, David Moyes, guided Everton to a safe finish in fifteenth place.

In 2002–03 Everton finished seventh, which was its highest finish since 1996. It was under Moyes' management that Wayne Rooney broke into the first team before being sold to Manchester United for a club record fee of £28 million in the summer of 2004. A fourth-place finish in 2004–05 ensured that Everton qualified for the UEFA Champions League qualifying round. The team failed to make it through to the Champions League group stage and was then eliminated from the UEFA Cup. Everton qualified for the 2007–08 and 2008–09 UEFA Cup competitions, and was the runner-up in the 2009 FA Cup Final. During this period, Moyes broke the club record for highest transfer fee paid on four occasions: signing James Beattie for £6 million in January 2005, Andy Johnson for £8.6 million in summer 2006, Yakubu for £11.25 million in summer 2007, and Marouane Fellaini for £15 million in September 2008.

At the end of the 2012–13 season, Moyes left his position at Everton to take over at Manchester United, bringing in staff from Everton to join him in July (assistant manager Steve Round, goalkeeping coach Chris Woods and coach Jimmy Lumsden), with Everton players Phil Neville and Marouane Fellaini also leaving for United, the former joining the coaching staff. Moyes was replaced by Roberto Martínez, who led Everton to 5th place in the Premier League in his first season while amassing the club's best points tally in 27 years with 72. The following season, Martínez led Everton to the last 16 of the 2014-15 UEFA Europa League, where it was defeated by Dynamo Kyiv, whilst domestically finishing 11th in the Premier League. Everton reached the semi-finals of both the League Cup and the FA Cup in 2015–16, but was defeated in both. After a poor run of form in the Premier League, Martínez was sacked following the penultimate game of the season, with Everton lying in 12th place.

Martínez was replaced in the summer of 2016 by Ronald Koeman, who left Southampton to sign a three-year contract with Everton. In his first season at the club, he qualified for the Europa League, but a poor start to the 2017–18 season left Everton in the relegation zone after nine games, and Koeman was sacked on 23 October following a 5–2 home defeat to Arsenal. Sam Allardyce was appointed Everton manager in November 2017, but he resigned at the end of the season amid fan discontent at his style of play.

Marco Silva was named Everton manager in May 2018. In November that year, the club was banned from signing academy football players from its youth clubs for two years. Silva led Everton to finish 8th in his first season in charge, but after a poor start to the following season which left the team in the relegation zone on 14 points, he was sacked on 5 December 2019. His last league match was a 5–2 loss to Liverpool at Anfield. Former player and first-team coach Duncan Ferguson stepped in as caretaker manager for the next three games before his replacement, Carlo Ancelotti; Ferguson stayed as assistant manager.

Ancelotti left the club in June 2021 to rejoin former club Real Madrid as manager, having led the club to a 10th place finish in his only full season at the club. Former Liverpool manager Rafael Benítez was appointed as his replacement, subsequently becoming only the second person to manage both Liverpool and Everton. He was dismissed in January 2022 following 9 losses in his last 13 games in charge at the club, and was replaced by former Chelsea boss Frank Lampard. Lampard was later also dismissed in January 2023 after extremely poor performance.

Colours 

Everton's traditional home colours are royal blue shirts, white shorts and white socks. However, during the first decades of its history, Everton had several different kit colours. The team originally played in white and then blue and white stripes, but as new players arriving at the club wore its old team's shirts during matches, confusion soon ensued. It was decided that the shirts would be dyed black, both to save on expenses and to instill a more professional look. However, the kit appeared morbid, so a scarlet sash was added. When the club moved to Goodison Park in 1892, the colours were salmon pink and dark blue striped shirts with dark blue shorts. The club later switched to ruby shirts with blue trim and dark blue shorts. Royal blue jerseys with white shorts were first used in the 1901–02 season. The club played in sky blue in 1906; however, the fans protested, and the colour reverted to royal blue. Occasionally, Everton have played in lighter shades than royal blue (such as in 1930–31 and 1997–98). The home kit today is royal blue shirts with white shorts and socks. The club may also wear all blue to avoid any colour clashes.

Everton's traditional away colours were white shirts with black shorts, but from 1968 amber shirts and royal blue shorts became common. Various editions appeared throughout the 1970s and 1980s. Black, white, grey, and yellow away shirts have also been used.

Crest 

At the end of the 1937–38 season, Everton secretary Theo Kelly, who later became the club's first manager, wanted to design a club necktie. It was agreed that the colour be blue, and Kelly was given the task of designing a crest to be featured on the necktie. He worked on it for four months until deciding on a reproduction of Everton Lock-Up, which stands in the heart of the Everton district. The Lock-Up has been inextricably linked with the Everton area since its construction in 1787. It was originally used as a bridewell to incarcerate mainly drunks and minor criminals, and it still stands today on Everton Brow. The Lock-Up was accompanied by two laurel wreaths on either side and, according to the College of Arms in London, Kelly chose to include the laurels as they were the sign of winners. The crest was accompanied by the club motto, "Nil Satis Nisi Optimum", meaning "Nothing but the best is good enough". The ties were first worn by Kelly and the Everton chairman, Mr. E. Green, on the first day of the 1938–39 season.

The club rarely incorporated a badge of any description on its shirts. An interwoven "EFC" design was adopted between 1922 and 1930 before the club reverted to plain royal blue shirts until 1972 when bold "EFC" lettering was added. The crest designed by Kelly was first used on the team's shirts in 1978 and has remained there ever since, while undergoing gradual change to become the version used today.

In May 2013, the club launched a new crest to improve the reproducibility of the design in print and broadcast media, particularly on a small scale. Critics suggested that it was external pressure from sports manufacturer Nike, Inc. that evoked the redesign as the number of colours had been reduced and the radial effect was removed, which made the kit more cost efficient to reproduce. The redesign was poorly received by supporters, with a poll on an Everton fan site registering a 91% negative response to the crest. A protest petition reached over 22,000 signatures before the club offered an apology and announced a new crest would be created for the 2014–15 season with an emphasis on fan consultation. Shortly afterwards, the Head of Marketing left the club. The latest crest was revealed by the club on 3 October 2013. After a consultation process with the supporters, three new crests were shortlisted. In the final vote, the new crest was chosen by almost 80% of the supporters that took part and began being used in July 2014.

Nickname 
Everton's most widely recognised nickname is "The Toffees" or "The Toffeemen", which came about after Everton had moved to Goodison. There are several explanations for how this name came to be adopted with the best known being that there was a business in Everton village, between Everton Brow and Brow Side, named Mother Noblett's, which was a toffee shop that sold sweets including the Everton Mint. It was also located opposite the lock up which Everton's club crest is based on. The Toffee Lady tradition in which a girl walks around the perimeter of the pitch before the start of a game tossing free Everton Mints into the crowd symbolises the connection. Another possible reason is that there was a house named Ye Anciente Everton Toffee House in nearby Village Street, Everton, run by Ma Bushell. The toffee house was located near the Queen's Head hotel in which early club meetings took place.

Everton has had many other nicknames over the years. When the black kit was worn, the team was nicknamed "The Black Watch" after the famous army regiment. Since going blue in 1901, the team has been given the simple nickname "The Blues". Everton's attractive style of play led to Steve Bloomer calling the team "scientific" in 1928, which is thought to have inspired the nickname "The School of Science". The battling 1995 FA Cup winning side was known collectively as "The Dogs of War". When David Moyes arrived as manager, he proclaimed Everton as "The People's Club", which has been adopted as a semi-official club nickname.

Stadium 

Everton originally played in the southeast corner of Stanley Park. The first official match took place in 1879. In 1882, a man named J. Cruitt donated land at Priory Road which became the club's home. In 1884 Everton became tenants at Anfield, which was owned by John Orrell, a land owner who was a friend of Everton F.C. member John Houlding. Orrell lent Anfield to the club in exchange for a small rent. Houlding purchased the land from Orrell in 1885 and effectively became Everton's landlord by charging the club rent, which increased from £100 to £240 a year by 1888 – and was still rising until Everton left the ground in 1892. The club regarded the increase in rent as unacceptable. A further dispute between Houlding and the club's committee led to Houlding attempting to gain full control of the club by registering the company, "Everton F.C. and Athletic Grounds Ltd". Everton left Anfield for a new ground, Goodison Park, where the club has played ever since. Houlding attempted to take over Everton's name, colours, fixtures and league position, but was denied by The Football Association. Instead, Houlding formed a new club, Liverpool F.C.

Goodison Park, the first major football stadium to be built in England, was opened in 1892. Goodison Park has staged more top-flight football games than any other ground in the United Kingdom and was the only English club ground to host a semi-final at the 1966 FIFA World Cup. It was also the first English ground to have under-soil heating and the first to have two tiers on all sides. The church grounds of St Luke the Evangelist are adjacent to the corner of the Main Stand and the Howard Kendall Gwladys Street End.

On match days, in a tradition going back to 1962, players walk out to the tune "Johnny Todd", played in the arrangement used when it was the theme song for Z-Cars. It is a traditional Liverpool children's song collected in 1890 by Frank Kidson and tells the story of a sailor betrayed by his lover while away at sea. On two occasions in 1994, the club walked out to different songs. In August 1994, the club played 2 Unlimited's song "Get Ready For This". A month later, the club used a reworking of the Creedence Clearwater Revival classic "Bad Moon Rising". Both songs were met with complete disapproval by Everton fans.

Training facilities 

From 1966 to 2007, Everton trained at Bellefield in the West Derby area of Liverpool. The club moved to the Finch Farm training complex in Halewood in 2007. The training ground houses both the Everton first team and the youth academy.

Everton Stadium 

There have been indications since 1996 that Everton will move to a new stadium. The original plan was for a new 60,000-seat stadium, but in 2000 a proposal was submitted to build a 55,000-seat stadium as part of the King's Dock regeneration. This proposal was unsuccessful as Everton failed to generate the £30 million needed for a half stake in the stadium project, and the city council rejected the proposal in 2003. Late in 2004, driven by the Liverpool Council and the Northwest Development Corporation, the club entered talks with Liverpool F.C. about sharing a proposed stadium on Stanley Park. However, negotiations broke down as Everton failed to raise 50% of the costs. On 11 January 2005, Liverpool announced that ground-sharing was not a possibility and proceeded to plan its own Stanley Park Stadium.

Following a unanimous approval by Liverpool City Council to grant planning permission in July 2021, work by contractors, Laing O'Rourke, began on the new stadium on 10 August 2021. The first phase involved infilling the dock with 500,000 cubic metres of sea-dredged sand, and so 2,500 vertical concrete piles have been inserted. Its capacity will be 52,888. It is due to open for the start of the 2024-25 season, replacing Goodison Park at an estimated cost of £760 million.

Supporters and rivalries 

Everton has a large fanbase, with the eighth-highest average attendance in the Premier League in the 2008–09 season. The majority of Everton's matchday support comes from the North West of England, primarily Merseyside, Cheshire, West Lancashire and parts of Western Greater Manchester along with many fans who travel from North Wales, Ireland, and Scotland. Within the city of Liverpool, support for Everton and city rivals Liverpool is not determined by geographical basis with supporters mixed across the city. Everton also has many supporters' clubs worldwide in places such as North America, Singapore, Indonesia, Lebanon, Malaysia, Thailand, India, and Australia. Paul McCartney of The Beatles is one of the more recognizable Everton supporters. The official supporters club is FOREVERTON, and there are also several fanzines including When Skies are Grey and Speke from the Harbour, which are sold around Goodison Park on match days.

Everton regularly take large numbers away from home both domestically and in European fixtures. The club implements a loyalty points scheme offering the first opportunity to purchase away tickets to season ticket holders who have attended the most away matches. Everton often sell out the full allocation in away grounds, and tickets sell particularly well for North West England away matches. In October 2009, Everton took 7,000 travelling fans to Benfica, which was its largest ever away crowd in Europe since the 1985 European Cup Winners' Cup Final.

Everton's biggest rivalry is with neighbours Liverpool, against whom the club contests the Merseyside derby. The rivalry stems from an internal dispute between Everton officials and the owners of Anfield, which was then Everton's home ground. The dispute resulted in Everton moving to Goodison Park and the subsequent formation of Liverpool F.C. in 1892. Following these events, a fierce rivalry has existed between Everton and Liverpool, albeit one that is generally perceived as more respectful than many other derbies in English football. This was illustrated by a chain of red and blue scarves that were linked between the gates of both grounds across Stanley Park as a tribute to the Liverpool fans killed in the Hillsborough disaster. The derby is usually a sellout fixture and has been known as the "friendly derby" because both sets of fans can often be seen side by side dressed in red and blue inside both Anfield and Goodison Park. Recently, on the field, matches have tended to be extremely stormy affairs; the derby has had more red cards than any other fixture in Premier League history.

Coaching staff 

First team

Under-21s and Under-18s

Players

First-team squad

Out on loan

Reserves and Academy

Notable former players 

See also List of Everton F.C. international players.

Everton Giants 
The following players are considered "Giants" for their great contributions to Everton. A panel appointed by the club established the inaugural list in 2000 and a new inductee is announced every season.

Player of the Year
Winners of the club's end of season award

 2005–06  Mikel Arteta
 2006–07  Mikel Arteta
 2007–08  Joleon Lescott
 2008–09  Phil Jagielka
 2009–10  Steven Pienaar
 2010–11  Leighton Baines
 2011–12  John Heitinga
 2012–13  Leighton Baines
 2013–14  Séamus Coleman
 2014–15  Phil Jagielka
 2015–16  Gareth Barry
 2016–17  Romelu Lukaku
 2017–18  Jordan Pickford
 2018–19  Lucas Digne
 2019–20  Richarlison
 2020–21  Dominic Calvert-Lewin
 2021–22  Jordan Pickford

Greatest ever team
At the start of the 2003–04 season, as part of the club's official celebration of its 125th anniversary, supporters cast votes to determine the greatest ever Everton team.

 Neville Southall (1981–97)
 Gary Stevens (1982–89)
 Brian Labone (1958–71)
 Kevin Ratcliffe (1980–91)
 Ray Wilson (1964–69)
 Trevor Steven (1983–90)
 Alan Ball (1966–71)
 Peter Reid (1982–89)
 Kevin Sheedy (1982–92)
 Dixie Dean (1925–37)
 Graeme Sharp (1980–91)

English Football Hall of Fame members
A number of Everton players have been inducted into the English Football Hall of Fame:

  Dixie Dean (2002 inductee)
  Paul Gascoigne (2002 inductee)
  Alan Ball (2003 inductee)
  Pat Jennings (2003 inductee)
  Tommy Lawton (2003 inductee)
  Gary Lineker (2003 inductee)
  Howard Kendall (2005 inductee)
  Peter Beardsley (2007 inductee)
  Mark Hughes (2007 inductee)
  Neville Southall (2008 inductee)
  Ray Wilson (2008 inductee)
  Joe Mercer (2009 inductee)
  Harry Catterick (2010 inductee)
  Peter Reid (2014 inductee)
  Gary Speed (2017 inductee)

Football League 100 Legends
The Football League 100 Legends is a list of "100 legendary football players" produced by the Football League in 1998 to celebrate the 100th season of League football.

  Alan Ball
  Dixie Dean
  Paul Gascoigne
  Tommy Lawton
  Gary Lineker
  Joe Mercer
  Neville Southall
  Alex Young

Honours

Domestic

League
First Division/Premier League
Champions (9): 1890–91, 1914–15, 1927–28, 1931–32, 1938–39, 1962–63, 1969–70, 1984–85, 1986–87
Second Division/Championship
Winners (1): 1930–31

Cups
FA Cup
Winners (5): 1905–06, 1932–33, 1965–66, 1983–84, 1994–95
Football League Cup
Runners-up (2): 1976–77, 1983–84
FA Charity Shield
Winners (9): 1928, 1932, 1963, 1970, 1984, 1985, 1986 (shared), 1987, 1995
Full Members Cup:
Runners-up (2): 1989, 1991
Football League Super Cup
Runners-up (1): 1985–86

European 
European Cup Winners' Cup
Winners: (1): 1984–85

Doubles 
 1984–85: League and European Cup Winners' Cup

European competitions

Overall record

Ownership and finance 
Everton F.C. is a limited company with the board of directors holding a majority of the shares. The club's most recent accounts, from May 2014, show a net total debt of £28.1 million, with a turnover of £120.5 million and a profit of £28.2 million. The club's overdraft with Barclays Bank is secured against the Premier League's "Basic Award Fund", which is a guaranteed sum given to clubs for competing in the Premier League. Everton agreed to a long-term loan of £30 million with Bear Stearns and Prudential plc in 2002 for a duration of 25 years. The loan was a consolidation of debts at the time as well as a source of capital for new player acquisitions. Goodison Park is secured as collateral. On 27 February 2016, it was announced that Farhad Moshiri would buy a 49.9% stake in the club.

Figures taken from 2013 to 2014 accounts.

Shirt sponsors and manufacturers 
Since the 2020-21 season the club's primary shirt sponsor has been Cazoo, after the club announced the early termination of the previous deal with SportPesa in February 2020. The sponsorship does not extent to the club's women's team, who for the first time are able to sign their own shirt sponsor. Previous sponsors include SportPesa (2017–20), Chang Beer (2004–17) Hafnia (1979–85), NEC (1985–95), Danka (1995–97), one2one (1997–2002) and Kejian (2002–04). For the 2008–09 season, Everton sold junior replica jerseys without the current name or logo of its main sponsor Chang beer, which followed a recommendation from the Portman Group that alcoholic brand names be removed from kits sold to children.

Everton's current kit manufacturers since the 2020–21 season are Hummel, after a previous deal with Umbro was terminated early by the club. Umbro have been the club's kit manufacturer four times (1974–83, 1986–2000, 2004–09, and 2014–20). Other previous manufacturing firms are Le Coq Sportif (1983–86, 2009–12), Puma (2000–04) and Nike (2012–14).

The club currently has two 'megastores': one located near Goodison Park on Walton Lane named 'Everton One' and one located in the Liverpool One shopping complex named 'Everton Two', which gives the second store the address 'Everton Two, Liverpool One'.

Managers 

The club's current manager is Sean Dyche. There have also been four caretaker managers, and before 1939 the team was selected by either the club secretary or by committee. The club's longest-serving manager has been Harry Catterick, who was in charge of the team from 1961 to 1973 for 594 first team matches. The Everton manager to win the most domestic and international trophies is Howard Kendall, who won two First Division championships, the 1984 FA Cup, the 1985 UEFA Cup Winners' Cup, and three FA Charity Shields.

Records and statistics 

Neville Southall holds the record for the most Everton appearances with 751 first-team matches between 1981 and 1997. The late centre half and former captain Brian Labone comes in second with 534 matches. The longest serving player is goalkeeper Ted Sagar, who played for 23 years between 1929 and 1953. This tenure covered both sides of the Second World War and included a total of 495 appearances. Southall also previously held the record for the most league clean sheets during a season with 15. However, this record was beaten during the 2008–09 season by American goalkeeper Tim Howard, who ended the season with 17 clean sheets. The club's top goalscorer, with 383 goals in all competitions, is Dixie Dean; the second-highest goalscorer is Graeme Sharp with 159. Dean still holds the English national record of most goals in a season with 60.

The record attendance for an Everton home match is 78,299 against Liverpool on 18 September 1948. Remarkably, there was only one injury at this game, which occurred when Tom Fleetwood was hit on the head by a coin thrown from the crowd whilst he marched around the perimeter and played the cornet with St Edward's Orphanage Band. Goodison Park, like all major English football grounds since the recommendations of the Taylor Report were implemented, is now an all-seater and only holds just under 40,000, meaning it is unlikely that this attendance record will ever be broken at Goodison. Everton's record transfer paid was to Swansea City for the Icelandic midfielder Gylfi Sigurðsson for a sum of £45m in 2017. The sale of Romelu Lukaku to Manchester United was for an initial sum of £75m, a record fee between two English clubs and the largest sum Everton has received for a player.

Everton holds the record for the most seasons in England's top tier (Division One/Premier League), with 119 seasons out of 123, as of completion of the 2021-22 season (the club played in Division 2 in 1930–31 and from 1951 to 1954). It is one of six teams to have played in every season of the Premier League since its inception in August 1992 – the others being Arsenal, Chelsea, Liverpool, Manchester United, and Tottenham Hotspur. Everton against Aston Villa is the most played fixture in England's top flight. As of the 2012–13 season, the two founding members of the Football League have played a record 196 league games.

Everton's community department 
Everton's community department, Everton in the Community (EitC), is a charity that provides sports and other social activities for the local community including for people with disabilities. EitC represents the club in the European Multisport Club Association.

Relationships with other clubs 
Everton is connected to many other sports clubs and organisations. It has links with Irish football academy Ballyoulster United in Celbridge, the Canadian Ontario Soccer Association, and the Thai Football Association (where there is a competition named the Chang-Everton Cup, competed for by local schoolboys). The club also has a football academy in the Cypriot city of Limassol and a partnership agreement with American club Pittsburgh Riverhounds.

Everton has links with Chilean team Everton de Viña del Mar, who were named after the club. On 4 August 2010, the two Evertons played each other in a friendly match at Goodison Park named the "Copa Hermandad" to mark the centenary of the Chilean team. The occasion was organised by the Ruleteros Society, which was founded to promote connections between the two clubs. Other Everton clubs also exist in Colonia in Uruguay, La Plata and Río Cuarto in Argentina, Elk Grove in the U.S. state of California, and Cork in Ireland. There was also a team named Everton in Trinidad and Tobago. There was an Everton club in Auckland, New Zealand from 1907 to 1915 named because of the first FA Cup win.

The club owned and operated a professional basketball team by the name of the Everton Tigers, who competed in the top-tier British Basketball League. The team was launched in the summer of 2007 as part of the club's Community programme and played its home games at the Greenbank Sports Academy in Liverpool's Mossley Hill suburb. The team was an amalgam of the Toxteth Tigers community youth programme, which started in 1968. The team quickly became one of the most successful in the league by winning the BBL Cup in 2009 and the play-offs in 2010. However, Everton withdrew funding before the 2010–11 season and the team was re-launched as the Mersey Tigers.

In popular culture

Film and TV 
Ken Loach's 1969 television film The Golden Vision combined improvised drama with documentary footage to tell the story of a group of Everton fans for whom the main purpose of life—following the team—is interrupted by such inconveniences as work and weddings. Everton forward Alex Young, whose nickname was also the title of the film, appeared as himself.

Paul Greengrass's 1997 television film The Fix dramatised the true story of a match-fixing scandal in which the club's newest player Tony Kay (played by Jason Isaacs) is implicated in having helped to throw a match between his previous club Sheffield Wednesday and Ipswich Town. The majority of the story is set during Everton's 1962–63 League Championship winning season, with then-manager Harry Catterick played by Colin Welland.

In the 2015 Rocky film Creed, Goodison Park serves as the venue of the climactic fight scene. Footage of the stadium and crowd during a home game against West Bromwich Albion was used for the scene. Liverpool-born boxing champion Tony Bellew, a lifelong Everton fan, plays Creed's opponent and wore the Everton badge on his training gear and shorts.

Music 
The club entered the UK singles chart on four occasions under different titles during the 1980s and 1990s, when many clubs each released a song to mark reaching the FA Cup Final. "The Boys in Blue", released in 1984, peaked at No. 82. The following year, the club scored its biggest hit when "Here We Go" peaked at No. 14. In 1986, Everton released "Everybody's Cheering the Blues", which reached No. 83. "All Together Now", a reworking of a song by Liverpool band The Farm, was released for the 1995 FA Cup Final and reached No. 27. By the time the club reached the 2009 FA Cup Final, the tradition had largely been abandoned by all clubs and no song was released.

See also

Notes

References

Sources

External links 

 

 Everton News – Sky Sports
 Everton F.C. – Premierleague.com 
 Everton Former Players' Foundation

 
1878 establishments in England
Association football clubs established in 1878
FA Cup winners
Football clubs in England
Football clubs in Liverpool
The Football League founder members
Former English Football League clubs
Premier League clubs
UEFA Cup Winners' Cup winning clubs